Phyllanthus st-johnii is a species of tree or shrub in the family Phyllanthaceae. It is endemic to the Society Islands of French Polynesia, where it is native to the islands of Bora Bora, Tahaa, Raiatea, and Moorea.

References

Flora of French Polynesia
Least concern plants
st-johnii
Flora of the Society Islands
Taxonomy articles created by Polbot
Taxobox binomials not recognized by IUCN